Styx Branch is a stream in Sevier County, Tennessee in the United States.

The stream source is on the south flank of Mount Le Conte at approximate elevation of 5600 feet and the confluence elevation is 4117 feet.

The stream was named after the river Styx, in Greek mythology.

See also
List of rivers of Tennessee

References

Rivers of Sevier County, Tennessee
Rivers of Tennessee